The Government of No One: The Theory and Practice of Anarchism is a 2019 book by Ruth Kinna.

References

External links 
 

2019 non-fiction books
Books about anarchism
English-language books
Penguin Books books